Al Garhoud is a commercial and residential zone. It is near Mirdif and it is located in Dubai, United Arab Emirates. Al Garhoud is close to Dubai International Airport and therefore preferred by Emirates Airline pilots as a living place. The Emirates Aviation College is also situated in Al Garhoud.

The roads around Al Garhoud are notorious for their traffic. People generally leave out the 'Al' part of Al Garhoud and call it Garhoud.

The Emirates Airline/Emirates Group head office is in Garhoud. Daallo Airlines has its head office in the airport Free Zone.

Schools
Cambridge International School, Dubai
The Indian High School, Dubai 
Al Mawakeb School - Al Garhoud
 Grammar School, Dubai

References

Communities in Dubai